The Mavone is a river in Italy. It is located in the province of Teramo in the Abruzzo region of southern Italy. The river is the main tributary of the Vomano. Its source is in the Gran Sasso e Monti della Laga National Park near Corno Grande. The river flows northeast near Isola del Gran Sasso d'Italia and Colledara before joining the Vomano near Basciano.

References

Rivers of the Province of Teramo
Rivers of Italy
Adriatic Italian coast basins